Jean Louis Auguste Daum (1853 in Bitche – 1909 in Nancy) was a French ceramist, in glass.

He was one of the founder members of École de Nancy and the director of Daum studio. He was the son of Jean Daum, brother of Antonin Daum and father of Léon Daum.

References

External links
 

1853 births
1909 deaths
Members of the École de Nancy
People from Bitche
French ceramists